The Miss World Canada contest is a Beauty pageant held annually in different incarnations since 1957 to select Canada's representative to the Miss World contest. In 2017 MTC-W Inc. obtained the exclusive rights to send the Canadian representative to Miss World, chaired since 2016 by former Miss World Canada 1996 Michelle Weswaldi. The annual pageant is held each summer in Toronto, Ontario, but in 2020 the national competition was held on November 7. This year was integrated for the first time the head-to-head challenge competition as part of the Miss World Canada 2020 selection process, where all the 44 candidates faced off in an interview round hosted by the former Mr. World Canada 2012, Frankie Cena , and the first winner ever in Canada is Aiona Santana. The 70th Miss World Final will be held on December 16, 2021 at the José Miguel Agrelot Coliseum in San Juan, Puerto Rico. Toni-Ann Singh of Jamaica will crown her successor at the end of the event.

Representatives to Miss World
Color key

Winners by Province

Representatives to Miss Supranational
Color key

Winners by Province

Representatives to Miss Grand International

Color key

Winners by Province

See also
Miss Canada
Miss Universe Canada
Miss Earth Canada
Miss BC World

References

External links
Miss World Canada The Official Site

Canada
Miss World Canada
Canada
1957 establishments in Canada
Canadian awards
Recurring events established in 1957
Beauty pageants in Canada